Duanne Moeser (born April 3, 1963) is a Canadian-German former professional ice hockey player. He is currently the sports manager for the Augsburger Panther of the Deutsche Eishockey Liga (DEL). He is a member of the German ice hockey hall of fame.

Playing career 
Moeser attended Cornell University from 1982 to 1986, serving as team captain his junior and senior year, while winning multiple awards and accomplishments. In 1987, Moeser landed his first contract in Germany, signing with ERC Sonthofen, where he stayed until 1989.

Moeser then played 15 seasons with the Augsburger Panther, interrupted by stints at EC Kassel, Eisbären Berlin, EA Kempten and Starbulls Rosenheim, and is Augsburg's team's all-time leading scorer. He had his jersey number 7 retired by the club.

National team 
Moeser received German citizenship during his career: In 1997, at the age of 34, he made his debut on the German Men's National Team. and appeared in a total of four games for Germany.

Coaching and managing career 
After his playing career, Moeser served as assistant coach of Augsburger Panther from 2005 to 2012 and was appointed the club's sport manager in 2012.

Charity 
Moeser and his wife Christine founded "7 x Sieben - Gemeinsam Stark Für Kinder", a charity organization to support children and young people in the city of Augsburg.

Awards and honors

Cornell University:
 1984: Cornell University Nicky Bawlf Award (Team Most Valuable Player)
 1985: Joe DeLibero/Stan Tsapis Award (Presented for skilled efficiency, unselfish dedication, and hard-nosed competitive application)
 1986: Ironman Award (Presented to the player showing determination to overcome injuries)
 1986: Cornell Hockey Association Award (Presented to the player displaying enthusiasm, dedication, desire, and an unselfish willingness to give the team an extra ounce of energy)
Ivy League:
 1983: All-Ivy Honorable Mention
 1984: Co-Ivy Player of the Year, All-Ivy First Team
 1985: All-Ivy First Team
 1986: All-Ivy Second Team
Eastern College Athletic Conference
 1986: Eastern College Athletic Conference Honorable Mention

References

External links

1963 births
Living people
Augsburger Panther players
Canadian ice hockey coaches
Canadian ice hockey forwards
Cornell Big Red men's ice hockey players
Erie Golden Blades players
Eisbären Berlin players
Flint Spirits players
New Haven Nighthawks players
Starbulls Rosenheim players
Canadian expatriate ice hockey players in Germany